The 1972 North Indian Ocean cyclone season was part of the annual cycle of tropical cyclone formation. The season had no official bounds, but cyclones tend to form between April and December. These dates conventionally delimit the period of each year when most tropical cyclones form in the northern Indian Ocean. There are two main seas in the North Indian Ocean—the Bay of Bengal to the east of the Indian subcontinent and the Arabian Sea to the west of India. The official Regional Specialized Meteorological Centre in this basin is the India Meteorological Department (IMD), while the Joint Typhoon Warning Center (JTWC) releases unofficial advisories. An average of five tropical cyclones form in the North Indian Ocean every season with peaks in May and November. Cyclones occurring between the meridians 45°E and 100°E are included in the season by the IMD.

Systems

Cyclone One (01B)

Tropical Storm Five (05B)

Cyclone Nine (09B)
This storm was formed on 7 September, possibly due to a storm's remnant from the West Pacific Ocean. it gradually intensified to a Very Severe Cyclonic Storm by 9 September. The storm made landfall at Ichhapuram in Andhra Pradesh on 10 September. Due to the storm, 100 people and 8000 cattle were perished. Puri in Odisha recorded gust winds up to 185 kmph (115 mph). Heavy damages to agricultural crops took place at Odisha and Andhra Pradesh. Nearly 2 lakh people were affected by the storm. Ganjam District in Odisha was the worst affected by the storm. It was one of the most intense cyclones to hit India in the month of September.

Cyclone Ten (10B)
This cyclone was formed on 20 September and intensified to a Very Severe Cyclonic Storm despite being present over the upwelled waters due to Cyclone 09B. It made landfall at Gopalpur in Odisha on 22 September and dissipated by the next day. Wind gusts of up to 140 kmph (85 mph) were recorded at the time of landfall. Despite severe damage to crops and houses, no deaths due to the storm were reported.

Cyclone Twelve (12A)

Cyclone Fourteen (14B)
This cyclone was formed on 15 November and gradually intensified to a Severe Cyclonic Storm. After making an erratic loop, the storm made landfall at Sriharikota on 22 November. The lowest pressure was 983 hPa/millibars (29.0 inches) and wind gusts of up to 165 kmph (100 mph) were measured by the ship ATAF. 80 people were reportedly killed due to the storm. Several trees were uprooted and thousands of people were rendered homeless.

Cyclone Sixteen (16B)
 This storm has killed 80 people and 150 cattle. 30,000 people were rendered homeless. Cuddalore recorded gust winds up to 150 kmph (95 mph) at the time of landfall. Total damages in Indian Rupees were estimated to be 40 crores. The cyclone is visible on The Blue Marble photo taken by Apollo 17.

See also

North Indian Ocean tropical cyclone
1972 Atlantic hurricane season
1972 Pacific hurricane season
1972 Pacific typhoon season
Australian cyclone seasons: 1971–72, 1972–73
South Pacific cyclone seasons: 1971–72, 1972–73
South-West Indian Ocean cyclone seasons: 1971–72, 1972–73

References

External links
India Meteorological Department
Joint Typhoon Warning Center 

1972 North Indian Ocean cyclone season